Athani Kante Ghanudu is a 1978 Indian Telugu-language action drama film directed by G. C. Sekhar, produced by Adusumilli Lakshmi Kumar for Maruthi Productions starring Krishna Ghattamaneni, Jaya Prada and Kaikala Satyanarayana. Chakravarthy scored and composed the film's soundtrack.

The film released on 1 December as the thirteenth and last film release for actor Krishna in the year 1978 and emerged as a box office success.

Plot

Cast

Music 
Chakravarthy scored and composed the film's soundtrack which comprised 5 tracks. 
 "Cheppindi Chestha" — S. P. Balasubrahmanyam, Chakravarthy
 "Tholi Kodi" — S. Janaki
 "Guthi Vankaya" — S. P. Balasubrahmanyam
 "Cheli Hrudayamlo" — S. P. Balasubrahmanyam, P. Susheela
 "Aavure Sultan" — S. P. Balasubrahmanyam, P. Susheela

References

External links 
 Athani Kante Ghanudu at Gaana

1978 films
Indian action drama films
Films scored by K. Chakravarthy
1978 action films
1970s Telugu-language films